The Ajdabiya Revolutionaries Shura Council was a Libyan military coalition in Ajdabiya which was declared on 25 March 2015. On 15 December 2015, despite protests from the Mayor of Ajdabiya, the Libyan National Army began an offensive on Ajdabiya, which resulted in the defeat of the Shura Council on 21 February 2016.
  
The group has denied any ties to the Islamic State of Iraq and the Levant.

References

Jihadist groups in Libya
Ajdabiya